"If U Got It" is a song by American DJ and record producer Chris Malinchak. The single first appeared on August 14, 2012, under the French Express label, and was released on January 24, 2014. The song samples lyrics from "I'm Gonna Make You Love Me" by The Supremes and "Cruisin'" by Smokey Robinson.

Music video
A music video to accompany the release of "If U Got It" was first released onto YouTube on November 28, 2013, at a total length of three minutes and forty-seven seconds. This video features a guy who spots a gorgeous girl on a bus with "another guy" (in fact, a doppelgänger of himself). On the bus ride, she turns around and ogles him. The two, locking eyes as they repeatedly pass each other around the city of Barcelona. She stays with this "other guy", as he quietly pursues her. Later, he learns that she threw "him" out (their apartment upstairs from his). Afterwards, he meets another woman (a doppelgänger of the original woman), not knowing that this scenario would repeat itself all over again when they catch a bus."

Track listing

Charts

Release history

References

2014 singles
Chris Malinchak songs
2012 songs
Deep house songs